Michel Estevan (born September 28, 1961) is a French association football manager and former player.

Career
Estevan led AC Arles-Avignon from the Championnat de France amateur 2, the fifth division of French football, to the first division Ligue 1 before being relieved from his position on 30 June 2010. On 7 July, after meeting with the club's chairmen, Estevan was retained by the club despite being sacked the previous week. Eventually he was sacked by the club on 17 September.

Playing career
Estevan spent his playing career as a midfielder in the lower ranks of French football, making his professional debut in 1980 with Arles. After several years around France, he joined amateurs Stade Beaucairois in 1991 as a player-manager.

Coaching career
After three years with amateurs Stade Beaucairois as a player-manager (from 1991 to 1994), Estevan focused solely on his coaching duties, and managed to guide his club to win promotion to the Championnat National (third tier) in 2002. He left thereafter to join Martigues with little success (also because of financial issues), and in 2005 he was appointed head coach of his former club Arles, who were playing amateurs in the Championnat de France amateur 2 at the time of his signing.

With Arles, Estevan achieved an incredible feat of winning four promotions in his five seasons in charge, of which the latest one was probably the most surprising, as he achieved third place in the club's first season in Ligue 2 (with the club now named AC Arles-Avignon), thus winning promotion to the French top flight despite having the lowest budget in the league. Such results awarded him comparisons to French managing legends Guy Roux and Michel Le Milinaire, the only ones who had managed to win four promotions in five seasons before Estevan.

References

1961 births
Living people
Association football midfielders
Footballers from Algiers
French footballers
AC Arlésien players
Nîmes Olympique players
FC Sète 34 players
French football managers
FC Martigues managers
AC Arlésien managers
US Boulogne managers
Tours FC managers
Ligue 2 players
Stade Beaucairois players
AC Avignonnais players
21st-century Algerian people